Johnny Sandon (originally named William "Billy" Francis Beck, 27 May 1941, in Liverpool, Lancashire, England – 23 December 1996, in Rock Ferry, Merseyside, England) was an early rock and roll singer who was part of the Merseybeat phenomenon in the early 1960s.

Music career
He was a contemporary of the Beatles, and sang with several of their rival groups, including The Searchers from 1960 to 1961, and The Remo Four from 1962 to 1963.

He began singing at the age of 12 and in 1958 entered Hughie Green's "Opportunity Knocks" contest at Liverpool's Adelphi Hotel. He was spotted by the Searchers who asked him to join them and their first gig together was at St Luke's Hall Crosby Merseyside. As Johnny Sandon & the Searchers, he appeared with the Beatles on several Cavern bills - Wednesday 26/07/61; Wednesday 06/09/61; Wednesday 15/11/61; Wednesday 03/01/62 and Wednesday 14/02/62.

He joined the Remo Four in February 1962 and as the Remo Four with Johnny Sandon, he also appeared on several Cavern bills with the Beatles - Wednesday 28/03/62; Wednesday 17/10/62; Wednesday 28/11/62;Wednesday 06/12/62 and Wednesday 30/01/63. There were several other bills the group shared with the Beatles, including an appearance at La Scala Runcorn on Tuesday 11/12/62. Billed simply as Johnny Sandon, he appeared at the Cavern with the Beatles on Tuesday 20/03/62.

He recorded two singles with the Remo Four, both released in 1963; "Lies" B side "On The Horizon" and "Yes" B side "Magic Potion". As a single artist he continued recording for Pye and had three further singles released in 1964 : "Sixteen Tons" B side "The Blizzard"; "Donna Means Heartbreak" B side "Some Kinda Wonderful" and "The Blizzard" B Side "(I'd Be) A Legend in My Time".

After two years with the Remo Four (during which he signed a management contract with The Beatles' manager Brian Epstein and released two singles on the Pye Records label in the U.K.), Sandon left for a solo career, while Tommy Quickly became The Remo Four's new vocalist.

As Johnny Sandon he continued performing on Merseyside until the 1970s, when he reverted to his name Billy Beck and appeared on the club circuit as a comedian. He appeared on ITV talent show "New Faces" on 6 November 1976.

Discography
Studio Vinyl Singles
Yes / Magic Potion - Johnny Sandon And The Remo Four (Single),1963 
Lies - Johnny Sandon And The Remo Four  (Single)  Pye Records, 1963     
The Blizzard (Single)  Pye Records, 1964     
Sixteen Tons / The Blizzard (Single)
Donna Means Heartbreak / Some Kinda Wonderful (Single)  Pye Records,  1964
Studio Albums
Compilations, Tommy Quickly, Johnny Sandon, Gregoly Philips

See also
The Searchers
The Remo Four

References

English male singers
Musicians from Liverpool
1941 births
1996 deaths
20th-century English singers
20th-century British male singers